The Mad Locomotive is a 1922 short animated film and part of a series of films based on the comic strip Jerry on the Job by Walter Hoban. The film marks the final animated adaptation of the strip.

Plot
Mr. Givney's trains need coal to run but the station is out of supply. Because of this, Mr. Givney decides to collect coal from passengers.  Moments later, three men who want to go to some park arrive at the train station. With the new rules in place, the three men offer coal as well as their fares.

With the things collected, and the passengers on board, Mr. Givney and his employee Jerry set off in their train. After traveling several miles, the coaches are lost somehow, and only the locomotive is seen running on the rails. The locomotive starts to travel roughly until Jerry and Mr. Givney fall off. Mr. Givney appears to be happy, knowing he still has the passengers' fares. Jerry goes on to remind him that they no longer have a train.

The locomotive reaches some city, and seems animated. Hungry for fuel, the locomotive spots a truck loaded with coal. The locomotive eats every lump of coal before traveling again.

Back at the scene where Jerry and Mr. Givney were dropped off, the two guys sit around not knowing what to do. Momentarily, the locomotive comes back, much to their delight.

References

External links
The Mad Locomotive at the Big Cartoon Database

1922 films
1922 animated films
American silent short films
American animated short films
American black-and-white films
1920s American animated films
Rail transport films
Films directed by Walter Lantz
Animated films based on comics
1920s English-language films